Anton Hahn (born 4 October 1984) is a German speed skater who is specialized in short distances. In the 2005-06 season he was second at the German national sprint championships, while he came in 34th at the World Championships. A year later he became German champion at the 500 metres.

External links
Anton Hahn at SpeedSkatingStats.com

Living people
1984 births
German male speed skaters
Place of birth missing (living people)
21st-century German people